O Kun de Kun Falls is a waterfall of the Baltimore River north of Bruce Crossing, in Ontonagon County, Michigan.

The Falls
There are two drops that make up O Kun de Kun Falls. The North Country Trail parallels both of the drops and allows access to the site. The falls are part of the Ottawa National Forest and are administered by the United States Forest Service. The falls are named after the Chippewa Chief O Kun de Kun (ca. 1760 - 1859) who was originally from the Ontonagon area.

Upper Falls
The Upper Falls is a  drop along the river. It is also sometimes referred to as Peanut Butter Falls.

O Kun de Kun Falls
The North Country Trail follows the river and a suspension bridge crosses the river just after the falls.

Access
The North Country Trail runs past the falls in both gravel and boardwalk sections. There is parking near the highway and camping sites near the base of O Kun de Kun Falls.

Images

References

Landforms of Ontonagon County, Michigan
Waterfalls of Michigan